The Swiss Formula is a mathematical formula designed to cut and harmonize tariff rates in international trade. Several countries are pushing for its use in World Trade Organization trade negotiations. It was first introduced by the Swiss Delegation to the WTO during the current round of trade negotiations at the WTO, the Doha Development Round or more simply the Doha Round. Something similar was used in the Tokyo Round.

The aim was to provide a mechanism where maximum tariffs could be agreed, and where existing low tariff countries would make a commitment to some further reduction.

Details

The formula is of the form

where

 A is both the maximum tariff which is agreed to apply anywhere and a common coefficient to determine tariff reductions in each country;

 Told is the existing tariff rate for a particular country; and
 Tnew is the implied future tariff rate for that country.

So for example, a value A of 25% might be negotiated. If a very high tariff country has a rate  Told of 6000% then its  Tnew rate would be about 24.9%, almost the maximum of 25%. Somewhere with an existing tariff  Told of 64% would move to a  Tnew rate of about 18%, rather lower than the maximum; one with a rate  Told of 12% would move to a  Tnew rate of about 8.1%, substantially lower than the maximum. A very low tariff country with a rate  Told of 2.3% would move to a  Tnew rate of about 2.1%.

Mathematically, the Swiss formula has these characteristics:
 As Told tends to infinity, Tnew tends to A, the agreed maximum tariff
 As Told tends to 0, Tnew tends to Told i.e. no change in tariffs as it is already low
 When Told is equal to A, the maximum, then Tnew is half of A. Thus the maximum tariff which is agreed is cut in half.

Criticisms

It has been argued however that the formula is too simple for use in tariff negotiations and that it does not lead to proportionate reduction in tariffs across all countries. It is because of this that those who believe an "ideal formula" exist are still looking for the ideal formula, with the Koreans having already suggested an alternative formula, though it has not yet been adopted nor is there any proof that an ideal formula exists.

References

International trade theory
Commercial policy